{{Infobox film
| name           = Easy to Love
| image          = Easy to Love lobby card.jpg
| image_size     = 
| caption        = Lobby card
| director       = William Keighley
| producer       = Henry Blanke (uncredited)
| screenplay     = Carl EricksonManuel Seff
| writer         = Adaptation:Carl EricksonDavid Boehm
| based_on       = 
| starring       = Genevieve TobinAdolphe MenjouMary AstorEdward Everett Horton
| music          = Heinz Roemheld (uncredited)
| cinematography = Ernest Haller
| editing        = William Clemens
| studio         = Warner Bros.
| distributor    = Warner Bros.
| released       = {{film date|1934|1|13|US}}
| runtime        = 61-62 or 65 minutes
| country        = United States
| language       = English
| budget         = 
| gross          = 
}}Easy to Love is a 1934 American Pre-Code romantic comedy film starring Genevieve Tobin, Adolphe Menjou, Mary Astor, and Edward Everett Horton. This was William Keighley's solo directorial debut – he had co-directed two earlier films with Howard Bretherton. It contains a mildly risqué scene with Tobin discreetly naked in the bathtub. Keighley and Tobin married in 1938. The film is based upon the 1930 play As Good As New'' by Thompson Buchanan.

Plot
When a woman finds out her husband is having an affair, she sets out to get even.

Cast

 Genevieve Tobin as Carol Townshend
 Adolphe Menjou as John Townshend
 Mary Astor as Charlotte Hopkins
 Edward Everett Horton as Eric Schulte
 Patricia Ellis as Janet Townshend
 Guy Kibbee as Justice of the Peace
 Hugh Herbert as Detective John McTavish

Uncredited:
 Paul Kaye as Paul Smith
 Hobart Cavanaugh as hotel desk clerk
 Robert Greig as Andrews, the butler
 Harold Waldridge as elevator boy

References

External links

 
 
 
 
 Stills at Pre-Code.com

1934 films
1934 romantic comedy films
Adultery in films
American black-and-white films
American romantic comedy films
1930s English-language films
American films based on plays
Films directed by William Keighley
Warner Bros. films
1930s American films
English-language romantic comedy films